Yıldırım Holding is a family-owned conglomerate headquartered in Turkey with companies in mining and shipping.  It owns Yılyak, one of Turkey’s largest coal importers and is on the global coal exit list published by Urgewald partly due to its interest in coal in Columbia.

Yüksel Yıldırım owns Samsunspor football club.

References 

Holding companies of Turkey
Coal companies of Turkey